Joe Lumsden (born 1875) was an English footballer who played as a forward.

External links
 LFC History profile

1875 births
English footballers
Liverpool F.C. players
Year of death missing
Association football forwards